The Pyramid (Moriori: Tcharako; ; officially The Pyramid (Tarakoikoia)) is a small island south of Pitt Island in the Chatham Islands group of New Zealand.  The site has been identified as an Important Bird Area by BirdLife International because it supports the only known breeding colony of Chatham albatrosses, with 4575 pairs recorded in 2001.

See also

 List of islands of New Zealand
 List of islands
 Desert island

References

Islands of the Chatham Islands
Uninhabited islands of New Zealand
Important Bird Areas of the Chatham Islands
Seabird colonies